The 14th Parliament of Singapore is the current Parliament of Singapore. It opened on 24 August 2020. The membership was set by the 2020 Singapore General Election on 10 July 2020.

The 14th Parliament is controlled by the People's Action Party majority, led by Prime Minister Lee Hsien Loong and members of the cabinet, which assumed power on 25 July 2020. 

The Opposition is led by Pritam Singh from the Workers' Party. Tan Chuan-Jin will be the Speaker of Parliament from the People's Action Party.

Result of the 2020 Singapore general election

The Progress Singapore Party, being the best performing opposition parties were awarded two Non-Constituency Member of Parliament seats in accordance with the Constitution. Hazel Poa, and Leong Mun Wai were appointed as NCMPs.

Officeholders

Speaker 

 Tan Chuan-Jin of the People's Action Party, MP of Marine Parade GRC.
 Christopher de Souza and Jessica Tan of the People's Action Party were elected as Deputy Speakers on 31 August 2020.

Leaders 

 Prime Minister: Lee Hsien Loong (People's Action Party)
 Leader of the Opposition: Pritam Singh (Workers' Party)

House Leaders 
 Leader of the House: Indranee Rajah (PAP)
 Deputy Leader of the House: Zaqy Mohamad (PAP)

Whips 

 Government Whip: Janil Puthucheary (PAP)
 Deputy Government Whip: Sim Ann (PAP)
 Opposition Whip: Pritam Singh (WP)
 Deputy Opposition Whip: Sylvia Lim Swee Lian (WP)

Committees

Select committees

Committee of selection
Chaired by Speaker of Parliament Tan Chuan-Jin, the committee of selection selects and nominates members to the various sessional and select committees. The committee consists of seven other members:
Indranee Rajah
Koh Poh Koon
Denise Phua
Pritam Singh
Tan See Leng
Edwin Tong
Zaqy Mohamad

Committee of privileges
The committee of privileges looks into any complaint alleging breaches of parliamentary privilege. Chaired by Speaker of Parliament Tan Chuan-Jin, the committee consists of seven other members:
Grace Fu
Indranee Rajah
Desmond Lee
Masagos Zulkifli
K. Shanmugam
Dennis Tan
Don Wee

Estimates committee
The estimates committee examines the Government's budget and reports what economies, improvements in organisation, efficiency or administrative reforms consistent with the policy underlying the estimates, may be effected and suggests the form in which the estimates shall be presented to Parliament. The committee consists of eight members:
Ang Wei Neng (Chairperson)
Lim Biow Chuan
Jamus Lim
Rachel Ong
Sitoh Yih Pin
Vikram Nair
Yip Hon Weng
Zhulkarnain Abdul Rahim

House committee
The house committee looks after the comfort and convenience of Members of Parliament and advises the Speaker on these matters. Chaired by Speaker of Parliament Tan Chuan-Jin, the committee consists of seven other members:
Cheng Li Hui
Eric Chua
He Ting Ru
Mohd Fahmi Aliman
Ng Ling Ling
Joan Pereira
Yeo Wan Ling

Public accounts committee
The public accounts committee examines various accounts of the Government showing the appropriation of funds granted by Parliament to meet public expenditure, as well as other accounts laid before Parliament. The committee consists of eight members:
Foo Mee Har (Chairperson)
Cheryl Chan
Louis Chua
Derrick Goh
Henry Kwek
Poh Li San
Saktiandi Supaat
Tan Wu Meng

Public petitions committee
The public petitions committee deals with public petitions received by the House. Its function is to consider petitions referred to the Committee and to report to the House. Chaired by Speaker of Parliament Tan Chuan-Jin, the committee consists of seven other members:
S. Iswaran
Ong Ye Kung
Rahayu Mahzam
Hany Soh
Edwin Tong
Lawrence Wong

Standing orders committee
The standing orders committee reviews the Standing Orders from time to time and recommends amendments and reports to the House on all matters relating to them. Chaired by Speaker of Parliament Tan Chuan-Jin, the committee consists of the Deputy Speakers of Parliament and seven other members:
Christopher de Souza (Deputy Speaker)
Jessica Tan (Deputy Speaker)
Gerald Giam
Indranee Rajah
Janil Puthucheary
Mohamed Sharael Taha
Sim Ann
Alvin Tan
Melvin Yong

Special Select Committee on Nominations for Appointment as Nominated Members of Parliament
The special select committee is set up to nominate persons for appointment as Nominated Members of Parliament by the President. Chaired by Speaker of Parliament Tan Chuan-Jin, the committee consists of seven other members:
Chan Chun Sing
Gan Kim Yong 
Gan Siow Huang
Indranee Rajah
Mohamad Maliki Bin Osman
Leon Perera
Vivian Balakrishnan

Government Parliamentary Committees
Mooted by then-Deputy Prime Minister Goh Chok Tong in 1987, government parliamentary committees (GPCs) are set up by the governing People's Action Party to scrutinise the legislation and programmes of the various Ministries. They also serve as an additional channel of feedback on government policies.

See also
Lists of members of parliament in Singapore

References

Parliament of Singapore
Singapore